The Local Government (Gaelic Names) (Scotland) Act 1997 enables local councils in Scotland to rename the areas for which they are responsible with Gaelic names. It enables them also to revert to names in English. The act was passed by the Parliament of the United Kingdom.

The act added subsections 1A and 1B under section 23 (change of name of local government area) of the Local Government (Scotland) Act 1973.  The Local Government etc. (Scotland) Act 1994 states that the name of a council (in Gaelic) shall be "Comhairle" with the addition of the name of their area.

The only council to date (2020) that has taken up the new right is Comhairle nan Eilean Siar (formerly Western Isles Council), meaning that the former Western Isles are now officially named Na h-Eileanan Siar, even in English-language contexts.

External links
 Comhairle nan Eilean Siar website

United Kingdom Acts of Parliament 1997
Local government in Scotland
Scottish Gaelic language
Acts of the Parliament of the United Kingdom concerning Scotland
1997 in Scotland
Local government legislation in the United Kingdom